C/2019 U6 (Lemmon), or Comet Lemmon is a long period comet with a near-parabolic orbit discovered by the Mount Lemmon Survey on October 31, 2019. It made its closest approach to the Sun on June 18, 2020. In June 2020 it was visible near the naked eye limit at an apparent magnitude of 6.0. It is the 3rd brightest naked eye comet of 2020 after C/2020 F3 (NEOWISE) and C/2020 F8 (SWAN). It remained visible near the naked eye limit in June.

This perihelion passage will decrease the comet's orbital period from about 10500 years to about 5200 years.

References
 

Astronomical objects discovered in 2019
Comets in 2020